Jesse King (born July 12, 1992) is a Canadian professional indoor lacrosse forward who plays for and captains the Calgary Roughnecks in the National Lacrosse League, wearing #19. He has previously played for the Georgia Swarm, Rochester Rattlers, Atlanta Blaze, and Chrome LC.

King was named to the 2016 NLL All-Rookie Team. In college, he played for the Ohio State Buckeyes lacrosse team.

Statistics

NLL

MLL

PLL

External links 
Career statistics via statscrew.com

References

1992 births
Living people
Atlanta Blaze players
Calgary Roughnecks players
Canadian lacrosse players
Georgia Swarm players
Lacrosse people from British Columbia
Ohio State Buckeyes men's lacrosse players
Rochester Rattlers players
Sportspeople from Victoria, British Columbia